Darvari Glacier is the 9 km long in northwest-southeast direction and 1.7 km wide glacier on Nordenskjöld Coast in Graham Land, Antarctica situated southwest of Boryana Glacier and northeast of Zaychar Glacier.  It drains the southeast slopes of Detroit Plateau, flowing between Rice Bastion and Grivitsa Ridge, and entering Mundraga Bay in Weddell Sea 6 km north of Fothergill Point.

The glacier is named after the settlement of Darvari in Northern Bulgaria.

Location

British mapping in 1978.

Map
 British Antarctic Territory.  Scale 1:200000 topographic map.  DOS 610 Series, Sheet W 64 60.  Directorate of Overseas Surveys, UK, 1978.

References
 Darvari Glacier. SCAR Composite Antarctic Gazetteer.
 Bulgarian Antarctic Gazetteer. Antarctic Place-names Commission. (details in Bulgarian, basic data in English)

Bulgaria and the Antarctic
Glaciers of Nordenskjöld Coast